Verdun: Visions of History is a 1928 French docudrama film directed by Léon Poirier. It portrays the battle of Verdun, primarily by recreating the battle on its location, but also with the use of newsreel footage and dramatic scenes. Most of the people in the film are actual French and German World War I veterans, including Marshal Philippe Pétain who portrays himself. The film has a pacifist message.

Cast
 Albert Préjean as the French soldier
 Jeanne Marie-Laurent as the mother
 Suzanne Bianchetti as the wife
 Hans Brausewetter as the German soldier
 Thomy Bourdelle as the German officer
 Pierre Nay as the boy
 Maurice Schutz as the Marshal of the empire
 Antonin Artaud as the intellectual
 Daniel Mendaille as the husband
 Philippe Pétain as Philippe Pétain
Other than Pétain, the film pays tribute to the officers Robert Nivelle, Charles Mangin, Ferdinand Foch and Georges Guynemer.

Release
The film premiered on 8 November 1928 with a screening at the Palais Garnier, in the presence of the French president and the German ambassador, with an original orchestra score by André Petiot. It was released in regular cinemas on 23 November 1928. In 1931, Poirier re-edited the film and added an audio track to create a sound film, which was released under the title Verdun, souvenirs d'histoire ("memories of history"). The sound version runs at 115 minutes, while the original silent version is 151 minutes long. Most prints of the film were destroyed during World War II. A good print was discovered in Moscow 50 years later and was restored by the Cinémathèque de Toulouse in 2006.

References

1920s war drama films
1928 films
Anti-war films about World War I
Battle of Verdun
French docudrama films
Films directed by Léon Poirier
Films set in 1916
French silent feature films
French war drama films
1920s French-language films
Western Front (World War I) films
World War I films based on actual events
Cultural depictions of Philippe Pétain
1928 drama films
French World War I films
Silent drama films
Silent war films
1920s French films